God Is Greater than Man is Jamaican reggae singer Luciano's 13th album.

Track listing 
 "Running for My Life"
 "Bring Back the Vibes"
 "Kingdom of Jah"
 "Give Thanks & Praise"
 "Bad Situation"
 "Cheer Up"
 "Borrowed Time"
 "Strive"
 "Enough Is Enough"
 "God Is Greater than Man"
 "Mankind Cease"
 "Take Me There"
 "Bad Situation Remix"

2007 albums
Luciano (singer) albums